Stig Larsson (born November 22, 1947) is a Swedish retired ice hockey player.

Career 
Larsson began playing hockey in Nacka SK, but joined Djurgårdens IF, where he played until he ended his career. He was part of Sweden's 1972 World Championship team that won bronze. Larsson became team captain for the 1976–77 season. 

Larsson was awarded "Rinkens Riddare", as the gentleman of the 1977–78 season. When he ended his playing career in 1979, Mats Waltin succeeded him as team captain. Larsson worked as an assistant coach under Bert-Ola Nordlander during the 1980–81 season.

Career statistics

References

External links
 

1947 births
Djurgårdens IF Hockey players
Living people
Swedish ice hockey forwards
Swedish ice hockey coaches